is a dam in Niigata Prefecture, Japan, completed in 2000.

References 

Dams in Niigata Prefecture
Dams completed in 2000
2000 establishments in Japan